L.A. Bounty is a 1989 action thriller film directed by Worth Keeter, starring Sybil Danning, Wings Hauser and Blackie Dammett.

Plot
Ruger (Sybil Danning), an ex-cop-turned-bounty hunter goes after a crazed killer.

Cast
 Sybil Danning as Ruger
 Wings Hauser as Cavanaugh
 Blackie Dammett as James Maxwell
 Henry Darrow as Lt. Chandler
 Frank Doubleday as Rand
 Robert Hanley as Mike Rhodes
 Lenore Kasdorf as Kelly Rhodes
 Bob Minor as Martin
 Robert Quarry as Jimmy
 Van Quattro as Michaels
 Branscombe Richmond as Willis
 J. Christopher Sullivan as Mayor Burrows
 Maxine Wasa as Cavanaugh's Girl

Home video
L.A Bounty was originally released on VHS in 1989 by IVE Entertainment, and re-released in 1992 by Avid Home Entertainment.
In 2001, MGM Home Entertainment released it as an exclusive at Amazon.com. There has yet to be a DVD release.

References

External links 
 
 
 
 Review of L.A. Bounty at Manor on Movies

1989 films
1989 drama films
American drama films
Girls with guns films
Films directed by Worth Keeter
1980s English-language films
1980s American films